The Japanese Journal of Radiology (formerly: Radiation Medicine) is a peer-reviewed journal, officially published by the Japan Radiological Society. 

It provides a forum for the publication of papers documenting recent advances and new developments in the field of radiology in medicine and biology. 

Editor-in-Chief is N Tamaki. 

ISSN: 1867-1071 (print version)

ISSN: 1867-108X (electronic version)

References

External links 

Radiology and medical imaging journals